Northern Railway Cricket Ground is a multi purpose stadium in Jodhpur, Rajasthan. The ground is mainly used for organizing matches of football, cricket and other sports. The stadium has hosted two Ranji Trophy match  in 1970 when Rajasthan cricket team played against Vidarbha cricket team. The ground hosted one more Ranji Trophy matches in 1972 when Rajasthan cricket team played against Madhya Pradesh cricket team but since then the stadium has hosted non-first-class matches.

References

External links 

 cricketarchive
 cricinfo

Sports venues in Jodhpur
Cricket grounds in Rajasthan
Defunct cricket grounds in India
Sports venues completed in 1969
1969 establishments in Rajasthan
Football venues in Rajasthan
20th-century architecture in India